The Prix de la Photographie, Paris or Px3 is a European photography award. It was founded in 2007 and includes a Gold Award, Silver Award and Bronze Award.

Winning photographs from the competition are exhibited in a gallery in Paris and published in an annual book.

Publications
PX3.01. Los Angeles: Prix de la Photographie, Paris, 2007.
PX3.02. Los Angeles: Prix de la Photographie, Paris, 2008.
PX3.03. Los Angeles: Prix de la Photographie, Paris, 2009.
PX3.04. Los Angeles: Prix de la Photographie, Paris, 2010.
PX3.05. Los Angeles: Prix de la Photographie, Paris, 2011.
PX3.06. Los Angeles: Prix de la Photographie, Paris, 2012.
PX3.07. Los Angeles: Prix de la Photographie, Paris, 2013.
PX3.08. Los Angeles: Prix de la Photographie, Paris, 2014.
PX3.09. Los Angeles: Prix de la Photographie, Paris, 2015.
PX3.10. Los Angeles: Prix de la Photographie, Paris, 2016.

References

External links

European culture
European arts awards
Photography awards
Awards established in 2007
International awards
International art awards